The May Bumps 2016 were a set of rowing races at Cambridge University from Wednesday 8 June 2016 to Saturday 11 June 2016. The event was run as a bumps race and was the 125th set of races in the series of May Bumps which have been held annually in mid-June in this form since 1887.

Head of the River crews
  bumps Pembroke on day 1 to go second, rowed over behind Caius on days 2 and 3, and caught Caius on day 4 halfway down the Long Reach.

  women rowed over on all four days to retain the headship for a third year.

Highest 2nd VIIIs
  remained the highest placed men's second VIII, and won blades.

  bumped  on day 1 to remain the highest second boat, and the only second boat in a first division.

Links to races in other years

References

2016 in rowing
May Bumps results
2016 in English sport